Maurice Marceau (1905-1979) was a French film actor. A character actor he appeared in a number of small or supporting roles during the 1930s, 1940s and early 1950s.

Selected filmography
 Moscow Nights (1934)
 A Rare Bird (1935)
 The Assault (1936)
 La Bête Humaine (1938)
 The Fatted Calf (1939)
 Three Artillerymen at the Opera (1938)
 Three from St Cyr (1939)
 The Rules of the Game (1939)
 The Emigrant (1940)
 Premier rendez-vous (1941)
 Mademoiselle Swing (1942)
 Fantastic Night (1942)
 The Honourable Catherine (1943)
 Shop Girls of Paris (1943)
 It Happened at the Inn (1943)
 The Ideal Couple (1946)
 Messieurs Ludovic (1946)
 Special Mission (1946)
 The Lost Village (1947)
 Monsieur Vincent (1947)
 Without Leaving an Address (1951)
 My Wife, My Cow and Me (1952)

References

Bibliography
 Valérie Vignaux. Jacques Becker, ou, L'exercice de la liberté. Editions du CEFAL, 2000.

External links

1905 births
1979 deaths
French male film actors
Male actors from Paris